The cyclical theory refers to a model used by historians Arthur M. Schlesinger Sr. and Arthur M. Schlesinger Jr. to explain the fluctuations in politics throughout American history. In this theory, the United States's national mood alternates between liberalism and conservatism. Each phase has characteristic features, and each phase is self-limiting, generating the other phase. This alternation has repeated itself several times over the history of the United States.

A similar theory for American foreign policy was proposed by historian Frank J. Klingberg. He proposed that the United States has repeatedly alternated between foreign-policy extroversion and introversion, willingness to go on international adventures and unwillingness to do so.

Several other cycles of American history have been proposed, with varying degrees of support.

Schlesinger's liberal-conservative cycle

 Lib: Liberal
 Con: Conservative
The Schlesingers' periodization closely parallels other periodizations of United States history, like in History of the United States, and links to Wikipedia articles on those periods are given as appropriate.

The features of each phase in the cycle can be summarized with a table.

The Schlesingers proposed that their cycles are "self-generating", meaning that each kind of phase generates the other kind of phase. This process then repeats, causing cycles. Arthur Schlesinger Jr. speculated on possible reasons for these transitions. He speculated that since liberal phases involve bursts of reform effort, such bursts can be exhausting, and the body politic thus needs the rest of a conservative phase. He also speculates that conservative phases accumulate unsolved social problems, problems that require the efforts of a liberal phase. He also speculated on generational effects, since most of the liberal-conservative phase pairs are roughly 30 years long, roughly the length of a human generation.

The Schlesingers' identified phases end in a conservative period, and in a foreword written in 1999, Schlesinger Jr. speculated about why it has lasted unusually long, instead of ending in the early 1990s. One of his speculations was the continuing Computer Revolution, as disruptive as the earlier Industrial Revolution had been. Another of them was wanting a long rest after major national traumas. The 1860s Civil War and Reconstruction preceded the unusually-long Gilded Age, and the strife of the 1960s likewise preceded the recent unusually-long conservative period.

An alternative identification is due to Andrew S. McFarland. He identifies the liberal phases as reform ones and conservative phases as business ones, and he additionally identifies transitions from the reform ones to the business ones. From his Figure 1,

Roughly agreeing with Schlesinger's identifications.

Huntington's periods of creedal passion

Historian Samuel P. Huntington has proposed that American history has had several bursts of "creedal passion". Huntington described the "American Creed" of government in these terms: "In terms of American beliefs, government is supposed to be egalitarian, participatory, open, noncoercive, and responsive to the demands of individuals and groups. Yet no government can be all these things and still remain a government." This contradiction produces an unavoidable gap between ideals and institutions, an "IvI" gap. This gap is normally tolerable, but it is a gap that sometimes leads to bursts of "creedal passion" against existing systems and institutions, bursts that typically last around 15 years. He identified four of them:
 1770s: Revolutionary era
 1830s: Jacksonian era
 1900s: Progressive era
 1960s: S&S: Sixties and Seventies (Huntington's name)

Huntington described 14 features of creedal-passion eras. Nine of them describe the general mood:
 "Discontent was widespread; authority, hierarchy, specialization, and expertise were widely questioned or rejected."
 "Political ideas were taken seriously and played an important role in the controversies of the time."
 "Traditional American values of liberty, individualism, equality, popular control of government, and the openness of government were stressed in public discussion."
 "Moral indignation over the IvI gap was widespread."
 "Politics was characterized by agitation, excitement, commotion, even upheaval — far beyond the usual routine of interest-group conflict."
 "Hostility toward power (the antipower ethic) was intense, with the central issue of politics often being defined as 'liberty versus power.'"
 "The exposure or muckraking of the IvI gap was a central feature of politics."
 "Movements flourished devoted to specific reforms or 'causes' (women, minorities, criminal justice, temperance, peace)."
 "New media forms appeared, significantly increasing the influence of the media in politics."
The remaining five describe the resulting changes:
 "Political participation expanded, often assuming new forms and often expressed through hitherto unusual channels."
 "The principal political cleavages of the period tended to cut across economic class lines, with some combination of middle- and working-class groups promoting change."
 "Major reforms were attempted in political institutions in order to limit power and reshape institutions in terms of American ideals (some of which were successful and some of which were lasting)."
 "A basic realignment occurred in the relations between social forces and political institutions, often including but not limited to the political party system."
 "The prevailing ethos promoting reform in the name of traditional ideals was, in a sense, both forward-looking and backward-looking, progressive and conservative."

Party systems and realignment elections

The United States has gone through several party systems, where in each system, the two main parties have characteristic platforms and constituencies. Likewise, the United States has had several realigning elections, elections that bring fast and large-scale changes. These events are mentioned here because their repeated occurrence may be interpreted as a kind of cycle.

Opinions differ on the timing of the transition from the fifth to the sixth systems, opinions ranging from the 1960s to the 1990s. Some political scientists argue that it was a gradual transition, one without any well-defined date.

Other dates sometimes cited are 1874, 1964, 1968, 1992, 1994, 2008, and 2016.

Skowronek's presidency types
Political scientist Stephen Skowronek has proposed four main types of presidencies, and these types of presidencies also fit into a cycle. He proposes that the United States has had several political regimes over its history, regimes with a characteristic cycle of presidency types. Each political regime has had a dominant party and an opposition party, and presidents can be in either the dominant party or the opposition party.

The cycle begins with a reconstructive president, one who typically serves more than one term. He establishes a new regime, and his party becomes the dominant one for that regime. He is usually succeeded by his vice president, his successor is usually an articulation one, and that president usually serves only one term. This president is usually followed by a preemptive president, and articulating and preemptive presidents may continue to alternate. The cycle ends with one or more disjunctive presidents. Such presidents are typically loners, detached from their parties, considered ineffective, and serving only one term.

Some of the articulating and preemptive presidents' types have been inferred from their party affiliations, and George Washington is here classified as a reconstructing president because he was the first one.

 Some of the sources propose that Presidents William McKinley or Theodore Roosevelt were reconstructing presidents instead of articulating ones.

The Klingberg foreign-policy cycle
Historian Frank J. Klingberg described what he called "the historical alternation of moods in American foreign policy," an alternation between "extroversion", willingness to confront other nations and to expand American influence and territory, and "introversion", unwillingness to do so. He examined Presidents' speeches, party platforms, naval expenditures, wars, and annexations, identifying in 1952 seven alternations since 1776. He and others have extended this work into more recent years, finding more alternations.

 Ext: Extroversion
 Int: Introversion
 (none): no events listed in the sources
Arthur Schlesinger, Jr. concluded that this cycle is not synchronized with the liberal-conservative cycle, and for that reason, he concluded that these two cycles have separate causes.

Criticism

Sean Trende, senior elections analyst at RealClearPolitics, who argues against realignment theory and the "emerging Democratic majority" thesis proposed by journalist John Judis and political scientist Ruy Teixeira in his 2012 book The Lost Majority states, "Almost none of the theories propounded by realignment theorists has endured the test of time... It turns out that finding a 'realigning' election is a lot like finding an image of Jesus in a grilled-cheese sandwich – if you stare long enough and hard enough, you will eventually find what you are looking for." In August 2013, Trende observed that U.S. presidential election results from 1880 through 2012 form a 0.96 correlation with the expected sets of outcomes (i.e. events) in the binomial distribution of a fair coin flip experiment. In May 2015, statistician and FiveThirtyEight editor-in-chief Nate Silver argued against a blue wall Electoral College advantage for the Democratic Party in the 2016 U.S. presidential election, and in post-election analysis, Silver cited Trende in noting that "there are few if any permanent majorities" and both Silver and Trende argued that the "emerging Democratic majority" thesis led most news coverage and commentary preceding the election to overstate Hillary Clinton's chances of being elected.

See also
Cycle of violence
Determinism
Deterministic system
Social cycle theory
Strauss–Howe generational theory

References

 Bundled references

Further reading

Cyclical theories
Historiography of the United States